Za makedonckite raboti (Cyrillic script: За македонцките работи, English translation: On Macedonian Matters) is a book written by Krste Misirkov and published in 1903 in Sofia, Bulgaria. The book presents the author's views towards the Macedonian Question, and explores the sense of national belonging and nеed for affirmation of the Macedonians as a separate people. The book marked the first complete outline of Macedonian as a separate language and proposed the need for its codification. The book also covers the rules of the standard language, its orthography and alphabet.

Background
Za makedonckite raboti marked the first attempt to formalize a separate Macedonian literary language. With the book, Misirkov outlined an overview of the Macedonian grammar and expressed the ultimate goal of codifying the language and using it as the language of instruction in the education system. The author proposed to use the Prilep-Bitola dialect be used as a dialectal basis for the formation of the Macedonian standard language.  His ideas however were not adopted until the 1940s. Misirkov appealed to the Ottoman authorities for eventual recognition of a separate Macedonian nation. He admitted there was not such one, and most of the Macedonian Slavs has called themselves Bulgarians, but it should be created, when the necessary historical circumstances would arise.

Printing history 

In November 1903 Misirkov arrived from Russia in Sofia for the purpose of printing his book, which was published at the end of the year. Most copies were confiscated or destroyed by the Bulgarian police and Internal Macedonian-Adrianople Revolutionary Organization (IMARO) activists, shortly after the book was published. As a consequence, in December, Misirkov arrived in Belgrade. Here he met with Stojan Novakovic, at that time a Serbian foreign minister. From his book, Novakovic ordered the purchase of 50 pieces by the Serbian Diplomatic Agency in Sofia. The purchased exemplars were shipped through Serbian diplomatic channels to Macedonia. Because of that at his own time, the book had little or no impact and did not become popular until the middle of the 1940s.

Consequences
According to some researchers Misirkov's principles played a crucial role in the future codification of Macedonian, right after World War II, while Loring Danforth considers that the language planners involved in the codification of standard literary Macedonian in 1944, were working in complete ignorance of Misirkov's work.

After the Second World War Misirkov's book will be permanently cited by the historians in Macedonia as an indication of the existence of a separate Macedonian ethnicity at his time. However, only two years later Misirkov changed his stance, and published a series of articles in the IMARO press written from a Bulgarian nationalist perspective, claiming Bulgarian identity for himself and the Macedonian Slavs.

Notes

References

External links

  

Macedonian language
Macedonian literature
1903 books